Sun Ferry Services Company Limited, formerly New World First Ferry Services (in short New World First Ferry, First Ferry or NWFF), is a ferry service company in Hong Kong. The company was established in November 1999, when it took over the eight licensed ferry routes transferred from Hongkong and Yaumati Ferry in January 2000.

Background 
When the company commenced its service on 15 January 2000, it bought 14 ferries and rented seven hovercraft and catamarans from its predecessor. Since then it has introduced 10 fast vessels on Outlying Islands routes to phase out the rented vessels and to improve services.

It used to have a subsidiary, New World First Ferry Services (Macau) (abbreviated New World First Ferry (Macau)), which operated a fast ferry service between Kowloon (China Ferry Terminal in Tsim Sha Tsui) and Macau (Hong Kong-Macau Ferry Pier). In 2011, it was sold to Shun Tak-China Travel Ship Management Limited, the owner of TurboJET. That subsidiary has now been renamed.

Routes 
It operates the following routes:
Central to Cheung Chau and Mui Wo
Circular between Peng Chau, Mui Wo, Chi Ma Wan, and Cheung Chau
North Point to Hung Hom and Kowloon City
North Point to Joss House Bay (大廟灣) (special service which only operates on Tin Hau-birthday-festival)

Ceased routes:
Central to Peng Chau
Tsim Sha Tsui to Mui Wo and Cheung Chau 
Tuen Mun to Tai O (via: Tung Chung and Sha Lo Wan)
Tuen Mun to Chek Lap Kok / Tung Chung

Inter-cities
 Hong Kong to Macau (sold to TurboJET in 2011)

Fleet

Current fleet

Former fleet

Ownership
New World First Ferry was owned by NWS Holdings via NWS Transport Services. In the past, Chow Tai Fook Enterprises, parent company of NWS Holdings, owned 50% shares of NWS Transport Services until 2016.

New World First Ferry and NWS Holdings are named after New World Development, the flagship listed company of Chow Tai Fook group.

In May 2020, New World First Ferry was sold to Chinese government owned Chu Kong Shipping Enterprises. Chu Kong Shipping Enterprises is the parent company of Chu Kong Passenger Transport, which offers inter-cities passenger liner, for cities of the Pearl River Delta. Chu Kong is the alternative transliteration of Pearl River.

Following the sale, formal registration of the change of company name to Sun Ferry Services Company Limited took effect on 7 January 2021 in Hong Kong's Companies Registry.

See also
 New World First Bus, former sister company
 Sun Mobile, former sister brand, was known as New World Mobility

References

External links

 

Ferry transport in Hong Kong
NWS Holdings
1999 establishments in Hong Kong
Water taxis
Shipping companies of Hong Kong